Hydrogen Jukebox is a 1990 chamber opera featuring the music of Philip Glass and the work of beat poet Allen Ginsberg. Its name is taken from a phrase coined by Ginsberg, from his 1955 poem Howl.

History
Of the project, Glass said:
In 1988...I happened to run into Allen Ginsberg at St. Mark's Bookshop in New York City and asked him if he would perform with me. We were in the poetry section, and he grabbed a book from the shelf and pointed out Wichita Vortex Sutra. The poem, written in 1966 and reflecting the anti-war mood of the times, seemed highly appropriate for the occasion. I composed a piano piece to accompany Allen's reading, which took place at the Schubert Theater on Broadway.

Allen and I so thoroughly enjoyed the collaboration that we soon began talking about expanding our performance into an evening-length music-theater work. It was right after the 1988 presidential election, and neither Bush nor Dukakis seemed to talk about anything that was going on. I remember saying to Allen, if these guys aren't going to talk about the issues then we should.

The piece was intended to form a portrait of America covering the 1950s through the late 1980s.  Glass and Ginsberg sought to incorporate the personal poems of Ginsberg, reflecting on social issues: the anti-war movement, the sexual revolution, drugs, eastern philosophy, environmental issues. The six vocal parts were thought to represent six archetypal American characters- a waitress, a policeman, a businessman, a cheerleader, a priest, and a mechanic.

Ginsberg said:
Ultimately, the motif of Hydrogen Jukebox, the underpinning, the secret message, secret activity, is to relieve human suffering by communicating some kind of enlightened awareness of various themes, topics, obsessions, neuroses, difficulties, problems, perplexities that we encounter as we end the millennium.

The title Hydrogen Jukebox comes from a verse in the poem Howl: '...listening to the crack of doom on the hydrogen jukebox...' It signifies a state of hypertrophic high-tech, a psychological state in which people are at the limit of their sensory input with civilization's military jukebox, a loud industrial roar, or a music that begins to shake the bones and penetrate the nervous system as a hydrogen bomb may do someday, reminder of apocalypse.

The work formally premiered May 26, 1990 at the Spoleto Music Festival in Charleston, SC. However, the workshop staged version had premiered one month earlier at the American Music Theater Festival held in the Plays and Players theater, 1714 Delancey Place, Philadelphia, PA on April 26. It ran there until May 6, followed on that closing night by an invitation-only reception attended by Philip Glass and Allen Ginsberg and other members of the company was held nearby.

The Australasian premiere was given on April 17, 2003 at the Mount Nelson Theatre (Hobart, Tasmania) by the Tasmanian Conservatorium of Music, conducted by Douglas Knehans and directed by Robert Jarman.

Songs

Part one
 "Song No. 1 from Iron Horse"
 "Song No. 2 Jahweh and Allah Battle"
 "Song No. 3 from Iron Horse"
 "Song No. 4 To P. O."
 "Song No. 5 from Crossing Nation; Over Denver Again; Going to Chicago and To Poe: Over the Planet, Air Albany-Baltimore"
 "Song #6 from Wichita Vortex Sutra

Part two
 "Song No. 7 from Howl"
 "Song No. 8 from Cabin in the Rockies"
 "Song No. 9 from Nagasaki Days (Numbers in Red Notebook)"
 "Song No. 10 Aunt Rose"
 "Song No. 11 from The Green Automobile"
 "Song No. 12 from N. S. A. Dope Calypso"
 "Song No. 13 from Nagasaki Days (Everybody's Fantasy)"
 "Song No. 14 Ayers Rock/Uluru Song and "Throw out the Yellow Journalists...""
 "Song No. 15 Father Death Blues (from Don't Grow Old)"

Personnel
World Premiere (Spoleto festivals)

Martin Goldray – conductor
Philip Glass – piano
Phillip Bush – keyboards
Alan Johnson – keyboards
Nelson Padgett – keyboards
Jack Kripl – winds
Rex Benicasa & James Pugliese- percussion
Richard Peck Jr-  winds
Suzan Hanson – soprano
Darynn Zimmer – soprano
Linda Thompson – mezzo-soprano
Richard Fracker – tenor
Thomas N. Potter – baritone
James Butler – bass
Allen Ginsberg – narrator
Jerome Sirlin – production design

Recording 
Martin Goldray – keyboards, conductor
Philip Glass – piano
Carol Wincenc – flute
Andrew Sterman – soprano saxophone, bass clarinet
Frank Cassara & James Pugliese- percussion
Richard Peck – tenor saxophone
Elizabeth Futral – soprano
Michele Eaton – soprano
Mary Ann Hart – mezzo-soprano
Richard Fracker – tenor
Gregory Purnhagen – baritone
Nathaniel Watson – baritone
Allen Ginsberg – narrator
Jerome Sirlin – production design

In popular culture 
Stephen Colbert met his wife, Evelyn McGee-Colbert, at the premiere of Hydrogen Jukebox at the Spoleto Music Festival in 1990. While interviewing Josh Brolin during an episode of the Late Show with Stephen Colbert originally telecast April 15, 2022, Colbert admitted that when Evelyn asked for his address, he didn't have a pen, so he borrowed one from the person behind him, which happened to be Ginsberg.

Hydrogen Jukebox is a Detroit rock'n'roll band formed in 2019.

References

External links
 PhilipGlass.com: Compositions: Hydrogen Jukebox
 PhilipGlass.com: Recordings: Hydrogen Jukebox

Operas
Operas by Philip Glass
Philip Glass albums
Chamber operas
Works by Allen Ginsberg
1990 operas
Minimalist operas